Tomás de Mattos Hernández (October 14, 1947 – March 21, 2016) was a Uruguayan writer and librarian. Being from Tacuarembó, de Mattos was one of the relatively few contemporary Uruguayan writers from the north of the country.

As a librarian, de Mattos also served as the director of the National Library of Uruguay.

He won Premio Bartolomé Hidalgo and the Fraternity Award un 1990.

Works
 La puerta de la misericordia (2002)
 Ni Dios permita ; Cielo de Bagdad (2001)
 A la sombra del paraíso (1998)
 A palabra limpia : premios y menciones, primer Concurso de Cuentos para Jovenes (1997)
 Historia estampada (1997)
 La fragata de las máscaras (1996)
 Bernabé, Bernabé! (1988)
 La gran sequía (1984)
 Trampas de barro (1983)
 Libros y perros (1975)

See also
 List of Uruguayan writers
 List of contemporary writers from northern Uruguay

References

1947 births
2016 deaths
Uruguayan male short story writers
Uruguayan short story writers
Uruguayan librarians
Members of the Uruguayan Academy of Language
Fraternity Award
Premio Bartolomé Hidalgo